This is a list of the gymnasts who represented their country at the 2004 Summer Olympics in Athens from 13 to 29 August 2004. Gymnasts across three disciplines (artistic gymnastics, rhythmic gymnastics, and trampoline) participated in the Games.

Women's artistic gymnastics 

North Korea entered Hong Su-jong into the 2004 Olympics under a birth year of 1985. However, it entered her into other competitions under birth years of 1986 and 1989, and her true age has not been publicly established. If born in 1989, she would have been ineligible to compete in Athens under International Gymnastics Federation regulations, which require gymnasts to be at least 16 or to turn 16 within the same calendar year as the Olympics.

Men's artistic gymnastics

Rhythmic gymnasts

Individual

Group

Male trampoline gymnasts

Female trampoline gymnasts

References 

Gymnastics at the 2004 Summer Olympics
Gymnastics-related lists